Richard Schaal (May 5, 1928 – November 4, 2014) was an American film and television actor born in Chicago, Illinois.

Career
In 1962, Schaal joined Chicago's famed Second City, becoming skilled in sketch and improvisational comedy. He was featured in a number of episodes of the 1970s sitcoms The Mary Tyler Moore Show (where he played no fewer than four different characters: Howard Arnell, his brother Paul, Chuckles the Clown and Dino), The Bob Newhart Show (as three characters: Don Fezler, Don Livingston and Chuck Brock), Rhoda (as Charlie Burke) and Phyllis (23 episodes as Leo Heatherton). His earliest appearance with Mary Tyler Moore was in the 1966 Dick Van Dyke Show episode "Dear Sally Rogers" (billed as Dick Schaal). In both The Mary Tyler Moore Show and Rhoda, the actor played alongside his then-wife, actress Valerie Harper. In 1983, he had a recurring role in Just Our Luck.

Personal life
Schaal was born on May 5, 1928, in Chicago, the son of Victor Cornelius Schaal (1896–1981), a machinist, and Margaret Schaal (née Margaret Semple Waddell; 1897–1983), a telephone operator.

Schaal was married three times, first to Lois Treacy, second to actress Valerie Harper, and third to Tasha Brittain. With Treacy, he had one child, American actress Wendy Schaal.

Schaal died November 4, 2014, in the Woodland Hills neighborhood of Los Angeles, California at age 86. No cause of death was provided. He was buried in Forest Lawn Memorial Park in Los Angeles.

Partial filmography

Films

Television

References

External links
 
 
 

1928 births
2014 deaths
Male actors from Chicago
American male film actors
American male television actors
20th-century American male actors
Burials at Forest Lawn Memorial Park (Hollywood Hills)
American people of Dutch descent